Alisa Walton (born January 15, 1970) is a Canadian actress best known for her work as Marigold on TVOntario's Polka Dot Shorts from 1993 to 2001, and as Socks the Monkey on the series' Elliot Moose on TVOntario and PBS.

Walton is also an accomplished dancer & mime artist. As a youth she trained with the Royal Winnipeg Ballet School and the Celia Franca School of Dance in Ottawa.

She is a certified Pilates instructor, and a photographer. She is also the artistic director of Crow's Feet Physical Theatre, a Toronto-based company of Dance and Circus Artists over the age of 40.

Selected credits
Polka Dot Shorts — Marigold
Elliot Moose — Soxielle "Socks" Monkey
Cirque Sublime Zero-Gravity Circus — Ringmaster/stilt dancer/clown

References

External links
 Pilates studio website
 Photography portfolio
 Crow's Feet Physical Theatre blog

1970 births
Living people
Canadian television actresses
People from Trois-Rivières
Actresses from Quebec